Anandraj Yashwant Ambedkar (born 2 June 1960) is an Indian social activist, engineer and politician from Maharashtra. He is head of the Republican Sena (tran: The "Republican Army"). He is the grandson of B. R. Ambedkar, the father of the Indian Constitution. His supporters occupied the Indu Mill land at Dadar in 2011 to highlight the long-pending demand for the Statue of Equality memorial of B. R. Ambedkar. Anandraj Ambedkar also works in the Vanchit Bahujan Aghadi, headed by his elder brother Prakash Ambedkar.

Life

The Ambedkar family are followers of Navayana Buddhism. He has two brothers Prakash Ambedkar and Bhimrao Ambedkar, and a sister Ramabai who is married to Anand Teltumbde.

References

1960 births
Living people
Maharashtra politicians
Politicians from Mumbai
Indian Buddhists
20th-century Buddhists
21st-century Buddhists
Anandraj
Buddhist activists
Vanchit Bahujan Aghadi politicians
Marathi people
Indian electrical engineers
Republican Party of India politicians